Christian S. Monsod is a Filipino lawyer who served as chair of the Commission on Elections (COMELEC). He was one of the framers of the 1987 Constitution of the Philippines. He is the founder and honorary chair of the Legal Network for Truthful Elections (LENTE) and pioneer of the National Citizens' Movement for Free Elections (NAMFREL).

Early life and education 
Monsod graduated from the University of the Philippines College of Law. He was a member of the Upsilon Sigma Phi. He passed the bar examinations in 1960.

Career 
Monsod worked for his father upon passing the bar. He worked for the World Bank Group from 1963 to 1970, and worked there as an operations officer for about two years in Costa Rica and Panama, negotiating loans and coordinating legal, economic, and project work of the bank. Upon returning to the Philippines in 1970, he worked with the Meralco Group and served as chief executive officer of an investment bank and subsequently of a business conglomerate. In 1975, he was awarded the Ten Outstanding Young Men (TOYM) Award for Finance.

He served as secretary-general of NAMFREL during the 1986 Philippine presidential election and eventually as its national chair in 1987. During the Corazon Aquino administration, he was appointed chair of the Commission on Elections. Monsod was formerly co-chair of the Bishops Businessmen's Conference for Human Development and has worked with underprivileged sectors, such as farmer and urban poor groups, in initiating, lobbying for, and engaging in affirmative action for the agrarian reform law and lately the urban land reform bill. Since 1986, he has rendered services to various companies as a legal and economic consultant or chief executive officer.

In 1995, he received The Outstanding Filipino (TOFIL) Award for government service and received an honorary Doctorate of Laws from the Ateneo de Manila University. In 2012, he received the Joe C. Baxter Award for his work on election administration.

Personal life 
He is married to Solita Monsod. They have five children.

References 

University of the Philippines alumni
University of the Philippines College of Law alumni
20th-century Filipino lawyers
21st-century Filipino lawyers
Members of the Philippine Constitutional Commission of 1986